Delaware Park may refer to:

Delaware Park-Front Park System, the Buffalo, New York park and parkway system listed on the National Register of Historic Places.
Delaware Park, New Jersey, a CDP in Warren County, New Jersey.
Delaware Park Racetrack, American horse racing track, casino, and golf course near Wilmington, Delaware.